A credit card imprinter, colloquially known as a ZipZap machine or Knuckle Buster, is a manual device used by merchants to record credit card transactions before the advent of payment terminals.

The device works by placing the customer’s credit card into a bed in the machine, then layering carbon paper forms over the card. A bar is slid back and forth over the paper to create an impression of the embossed card data and the merchant information on the imprinter. The customer signs these paper forms, with one copy as the customer receipt and the other kept by the merchant.

History
These devices were used from the advent of payment cards until the 1980s when electronic payment terminals started to replace them.  However they continued to be used well into the 2000s for places where network access was difficult, such as mobile locations like taxis and airplanes.

See also
 EFTPOS
 Payment terminal

References

Merchant services
Credit card terminology
Banking technology